Alf Handrahan (born December 27, 1949) is a former World Hockey Association player. He played fourteen games for the Cincinnati Stingers. He was born in Alberton, Prince Edward Island.

A fierce competitor, who gave it his all every shift whether it was with the stick or the gloves.  He was accepted into the PEI and New Brunswick hall of fame(s) in the early 2000s.

External links

1949 births
Canadian ice hockey right wingers
Ice hockey people from Prince Edward Island
Cincinnati Stingers players
Living people
People from Alberton, Prince Edward Island